Snowsill is a rare and unusual surname which has nothing whatever to do with "snow". It is in fact Old English locational and derives from the parish of Kneesall, near Ollerton in Nottinghamshire, England. Notable people with the surname include:

 Emma Snowsill (born 1981), Australian professional triathlete
 Elinor Snowsill (born 1989), Welsh rugby union player

Surnames of Old English origin